The Almirante class were two destroyers built for the Chilean Navy by Vickers in Barrow in Furness, UK, in 1960, named after Chilean admirals. They served until the late 1990s. They were fitted with a unique Vickers-designed 4-inch dual purpose naval gun, which fired up to 50 rpm. The gun was in advance of the standard RN 4.5-inch guns, more automated and reliable than the  3- and 6-inch mounts, but not water-cooled. It was rejected for RN use because of doubt about its sustained firing, the large stocks of surplus WW2, single 4.5- and twin 4-inch guns which the RN claimed wrongly were close to the new 4-inch N(R) in performance, and mainly because it was a private out-of-house, Vickers design The ships were modernised in Britain in 1975, and decommissioned in the late 1990s.

Programme

Chile decided to upgrade its destroyer fleet in the early 1950s and turned to British yards to fulfill the order. Bids were received from Vickers and Thornycroft; the Vickers design was chosen. The order was announced in January 1954 and finalised in 1955. The sensors were a mixture of British- and Netherlands-made radars.

Ships

Vickers offered two similar ships to the Colombian Navy but the Colombians bought two s from Sweden instead.

Notes

References
 Conway's All the World's Fighting Ships 1947-1995
 N.Freidman, British Destroyers and Frigates, Seaforth Publishing 2006
 Ship-Pics
 Riveros, Chilean Navy site 
 Williams, Chilean Navy site 

Destroyer classes
 
Chile–United Kingdom relations